WHFM (95.3 FM) is a classic rock radio station licensed to Southampton, New York, and serving eastern Long Island. It is owned by Cox Radio and simulcasts 102.3 WBAB.

History
The station began broadcasting as WWRJ on October 28, 1971, airing a beautiful music format. In 1979, it was sold to Beach Broadcasting for $700,000. In March 1979, its call sign was changed to WSBH, and it began airing an adult contemporary format. In 1985, the station was sold to a subsidiary of Faircom Inc. for $2,150,000. In 1987, its call sign was changed to WHFM. In June 1992, WHFM adopted a rock format, simulcasting WBAB. In 1994, the station was sold to Liberty Broadcasting for $1,850,000. In 1998, it was sold to Cox Radio.

References

External links
 

Classic rock radio stations in the United States
Cox Media Group
HFM
Mass media in Suffolk County, New York
Radio stations established in 1971
1971 establishments in New York (state)